The FIL European Luge Natural Track Championships 1989 took place in Garmisch-Partenkirchen, West Germany.

Men's singles

Women's singles

Men's doubles

Medal table

References
Men's doubles natural track European champions
Men's singles natural track European champions
Women's singles natural track European champions

FIL European Luge Natural Track Championships
1989 in luge
1970 in German sport
Luge in Germany
International sports competitions hosted by West Germany